Burning the Ballroom Down is the fourth album by American country rock group the Amazing Rhythm Aces, released in 1978 on the ABC label.  It reached #28 on the US country chart and #166 on the Billboard albums chart. (As with other albums by the group, it fell into the category of albums which were critically acclaimed, but sold poorly). The cover art is a book illustration by Danish artist Kay Nielsen titled "The Lovers Perish in Fire".

In 2000, Burning the Ballroom Down was reissued by the Special Products Division of Sony Music in the USA on a two-for-one CD which also contains the group's third album Toucan Do It Too.

Track listing 
 "Burning the Ballroom Down" (Russell Smith, James H.Brown Jr.) – 5:20
 "A Jackass Gets His Oats" (Russell Smith, James H. Brown Jr.) – 4:53
 "Ashes of Love" (Jim Anglin, Jack Anglin, Johnnie Wright) – 3:03
 "All That I Had Left (Left With You)" (Jeff Davis) – 3:32
 "I Pity the Mother and the Father (When the Kids Move Away)" (Russell Smith) – 2:07
 "Della's Long Brown Hair" (Russell Smith) – 3:13
 "Out of Control" (Billy Earheart) – 3:53
 "Red to Blue (When Dreams Come True)" (Russell Smith) – 5:18
 "The Spirit Walk" (Russell Smith, James H. Brown Jr.) – 6:01

Personnel 
Barry Burton – guitar, vocals, producer
Jeff Davis – bass
Billy Earheart – keyboards
James Hooker – keyboards, vocals
Butch McDade – drums, vocals
Russell Smith – guitar, vocals

References

The Amazing Rhythm Aces albums
ABC Records albums
1978 albums